Shenzhen Xinqiao Football Club is a professional Chinese football club based in Shenzhen, Guangdong.

History
Shenzhen Xinqiao qualified and gained a license for 2019 China League Two. However, the club officially quit from Chinese professional league system on 26 February 2019 and retook part in Shenzhen Super League.

Current squad

As of 20 July 2018

Results
All-time league rankings

As of the end of 2018 season.

Key
<div>

 Pld = Played
 W = Games won
 D = Games drawn
 L = Games lost
 F = Goals for
 A = Goals against
 Pts = Points
 Pos = Final position

 DNQ = Did not qualify
 DNE = Did not enter
 NH = Not Held
 WD = Withdrawal
 – = Does Not Exist
 R1 = Round 1
 R2 = Round 2
 R3 = Round 3
 R4 = Round 4

 F = Final
 SF = Semi-finals
 QF = Quarter-finals
 R16 = Round of 16
 Group = Group stage
 GS2 = Second Group stage
 QR1 = First Qualifying Round
 QR2 = Second Qualifying Round
 QR3 = Third Qualifying Round

References

Football clubs in China
Association football clubs established in 2017
Sport in Shenzhen